The 20th Street station was a station on the demolished section of the BMT Fifth Avenue Line in Brooklyn, New York City. It was served by trains of the BMT Culver Line and BMT Fifth Avenue Line, and had 2 tracks and 1 island platform. The station was built on August 15, 1889, at the intersection of Fifth Avenue and 20th Street. The next stop to the north was 16th Street. The next stop to the south was 25th Street. It closed on May 31, 1940.

References

BMT Fifth Avenue Line stations
Railway stations in the United States opened in 1889
Railway stations closed in 1940
Former elevated and subway stations in Brooklyn